Zeidora nesta is a species of sea snail, a marine gastropod mollusk in the family Fissurellidae, the keyhole limpets and slit limpets.

Description
The size of the shell is 4 mm.

Distribution
This species occurs in the Red Sea, in the Persian Gulf and along Réunion

References

 Vine, P. (1986). Red Sea Invertebrates. Immel Publishing, London. 224 pp.

External links
 To World Register of Marine Species
 

Fissurellidae
Gastropods described in 1890